Guo Junjun (born 2 January 1991 in Dalian, Liaoning)  is a Chinese female swimmer. At the 2014 Asian Games in Incheon, South Korea, Guo'group of four people won the Champion in the 4 × 200 m freestyle relay event in time of 7:55.17 in the final, 1:58.09 by herself. she is also the silver goldlist for 4 × 200 m title at 2015 World Championships in Kazan, Russia.

References

External links 
 
 
 

1991 births
Living people
Chinese female freestyle swimmers
Asian Games medalists in swimming
Asian Games gold medalists for China
Swimmers at the 2014 Asian Games
Medalists at the 2014 Asian Games
Swimmers from Dalian